Calliostoma peregrinum is a species of sea snail, a marine gastropod mollusk in the family Calliostomatidae.

Some authors place this taxon in the subgenus Calliostoma (Ampullotrochus).

Description
The height of the shell attains 25 mm.

Distribution
This species occurs in the Pacific Ocean off New Caledonia.

References

 Marshall, B.A. (1995). Calliostomatidae (Gastropoda: Trochoidea) from New Caledonia, the Loyalty Islands and the northern Lord Howe Rise . pp. 381–458 in Bouchet, P. (ed.). Résultats des Campagnes MUSORSTOM, Vol. 14 . Mém. Mus. natn. Hist. nat. 167 : 381-458

External links
 

peregrinum
Gastropods described in 1995